Ingleby railway station was a railway station built to serve the village of Ingleby Greenhow in North Yorkshire, England. The station was on the North Yorkshire and Cleveland's railway line between Sexhow and Ingleby, which opened in 1857. Ingleby station was closed in 1954 to passengers and four years later to goods.

History
The line eastwards from Stokesley to Ingleby was opened in February 1858, though the station at Ingleby wasn't opened until 1861. In 1859, two years before the station at Ingleby was opened, the North Eastern railway bought out the North Yorkshire and Cleveland Railway.

The timetable from 1864, when the line only extended as far as  railway station, saw the station served by four trains on a daily basis with an earlier train on Wednesday mornings towards Stockton labelled as a Market Train. This came back in the late afternoons and terminated at Castleton. There was also one extra market train service on a Saturday leaving Stockton at 16:30 for all stations to Castleton. Bradshaw's timetable of 1877 shows five out and back workings between Stockton railway station and Whitby, with connections advertised in Middlesbrough. A working North Eastern Railway document shows that the station had five passenger services each way throughout the week. The goods trains passing through were minerals, coal, the pick-up goods and a daily service of coke to the ironworks at Grosmont.

Return services were just five a day with four coming from Whitby. The other service from Whitby reversed at Battersby and went to Stockton via  railway station. By 1946, eight years before closure, the service was down to just three stopping services each way per day, with most of the services from Whitby to Stockton reversing at Battersby and going via Middlesbrough.

The station was closed to passengers in 1954, along with most others on the line, however, Ingleby was also closed to freight on the same day, the first on the line to do so.  When the line was lifted at the western end, the eastern portion from Battersby to Stokesley remained open for freight. This was finally closed in August 1965.

The nearest railway station to Ingleby is  railway station, which is located on the Esk Valley Line.

References

Sources

External links

Disused railway stations in North Yorkshire
Former North Eastern Railway (UK) stations
Railway stations in Great Britain opened in 1861
Railway stations in Great Britain closed in 1954